Sahl ol Din (also Romanized as Sahl ol Dīn; also known as Sahl ed Dīn) is a village in Miyan Velayat Rural District, in the Central District of Mashhad County, Razavi Khorasan Province, Iran. At the 2006 census, its population was 80, in 17 families.

References 

Populated places in Mashhad County